Suzanne Bélair, called Sanite Bélair, (1781 – 5 October 1802), was a Haitian revolutionary and lieutenant in the army of Toussaint Louverture.

Born an affranchi in Verrettes, Haiti, she married Brigade commander and later General Charles Bélair in 1796. She was an active participant in the Haitian Revolution, became a sergeant and later a lieutenant during the conflict with French troops of the Saint-Domingue expedition.

Capture and execution
Chased by Faustin Répussard's column of the French army, the Belairs took refuge in the Artibonite department. Répussard launched a surprise attack on Corail-Mirrault, and captured Sanité Bélair. Her husband turned himself over as well to avoid being separated from her. Both were sentenced to death, her spouse was to be executed by firing squad and she by decapitation because of her sex. She watched Bélair's execution, where he calmly asked her to die bravely, and went to her own execution as calm as he, refusing to wear a blindfold. It is said that at her capture, when threatened with beheading, she successfully asserted the right to an honorable soldier’s death by musketry, and standing before their muzzles cried “Viv libète! A ba esclavaj!” (“Long live freedom! Down with slavery!”)

Legacy

Sanite Bélair is considered as one of the heroes of the Haitian Revolution. In 2004, she was featured on the ten-gourd banknote of the Haitian gourde for the "Bicentennial of Haiti" Commemorative series.

References

Further reading
 Jomini, Antoine-Henri. (1842). Histoire critique et militaire des guerres de la Révolution. Brussels.

External links
 Mémoire de Femmes: Sannite Belair - (in French)

Image 
 Charles And Sanite Belair - Painting by British artist, Kimathi Donkor, (2002).

1781 births
1802 deaths
Haitian people of French descent
Women in 18th-century warfare
Executed Haitian people
People executed by France by decapitation
Women in war in the Caribbean
Women of the Haitian Revolution
Haitian independence activists
People from Artibonite (department)